Common names: golden tree snake,Ecology Asia - Snakes of Southeast Asia: page on Golden Tree Snake. ornate flying snake, golden flying snake  (more).Chrysopelea ornata (Thai:  งูเขียวพระอินทร์) is a colubrid snake found in both South and Southeast Asia. It is, along with the other species in its genus Chrysopelea, very unusual in that it is capable of a type of gliding flight. It is also rear-fanged. Currently, three subspecies are recognized. The snake's striking looks and capability of gliding make it a popular choice for captivity.

 Description Chrysopelea ornata is usually green in color, with black cross-hatching and yellow or gold colored accents. The body, though slender, is far less so than in other tree snakes. It has a flattened head with constricted neck, a blunt nose and large eyes with round pupils.

The lateral, sharp and pronounced keeled condition of the ventrals in association with the normal, not enlarged, vertebral row of scales distinguish this snake.

The tail is about one-fourth of the total length.Chrysopelea ornata has two major colour forms, and their descriptions are given below:
 In Sri Lanka and the southern extent of its Indian range, the snake is primarily greenish yellow or pale green. Each scale has a black mesial streak or spot, and is more or less edged with black. The snake also has dark crossbars at intervals. A series of large, flower-shaped, reddish or orange vertebral spots may be present or absent. Ventrals greenish, outside the keel edged with black or spotted. Head black with yellow crossbars and spots. The flower-shaped spots are more common in Sri Lanka than in south India.
 The second color variety which is more common in Southeast Asia lacks the reddish vertebral spots, and has less prominent black crossbars. But all varieties can be found throughout its distribution area.

Venom
This species is considered mildly venomous, with few confirmed cases of medically significant envenomation. Chrysopelea species are not considered so dangerous to humans as to be of medical importance.

Common names

 English - golden tree snake, iding snake, ornate flying snake, golden flying snake, gold and black tree snake,  flying tree snake
 Hindi - kala jin.
 Sinhala - pol-mal-karawala, malsara.
 German - Gelbgrüne Schmuckbaumnatter, Gewöhnliche Schmuckbaumnatter.
 Bengali - কালনাগিনী (Kaalnagini), উড়ন্ত সাপ, উড়াল মহারাজ সাপ, সুন্দরী সাপ, কালসাপ, কালনাগ 
 Konkani - Naneto
 Nepali Name - Seerise
 Thai Name: งูเขียวดอกหมาก (Ngoo kee-ow dork maak)
 Khmer Name: ពស់តុកកែ (Pous Tok Kae)
 Malayalam: nagathan pambu(നാഗത്താൻ പാമ്പ് )

Geographic range
India (North Bengal), Bangladesh, Sri Lanka, Nepal, Myanmar, Thailand, Western Malaysia, Laos, Cambodia, Vietnam, China (Hong Kong, Hainan, Yunnan), and Singapore (introduced).

In India Chrysopelea ornata ranges from the Western Ghats, up to the Dangs, Katernia Ghat in Uttar Pradesh, North Bihar, northern West Bengal eastwards to Arunachal Pradesh. It is also found in the forests of the Andaman islands.

Conservation
Not known to be endangered.

 Subspecies 
Three subspecies of C. ornata are recognized:C. o. ornata  – southwest IndiaC. o. ornatissima  – north and east India, Nepal, Bangladesh and Southeast AsiaC. o. sinhaleya  – Sri Lanka.

 Behaviour C. ornata is diurnal and arboreal. The snake's gliding ability, while not as impressive as that of the paradise flying snake (C. paradisi), still makes it capable of moving from tree to tree with relative ease. These snakes are excellent climbers, being able move across even the smallest of branches and even straight up trees with few branches by using the edges of rough bark. They are frequently seen moving up a coconut palm, or up vertical rock faces in graceful curves, gripping the somewhat uneven surfaces with their scales. They tend to be nervous, fast-moving snakes, and attempt to flee if disturbed, but generally do not hesitate to bite if handled. They are mildly venomous, but the venom is not considered to be dangerous to humans. It is intended to assist in subduing fast-moving, arboreal prey.C. ornata takes small arboreal prey, such as lizards, bats, and small rodents. It might also feed on bird eggs and insects. Also, it is reported to take snakes occasionally, and to avoid frogs, though frogs are also reported being eaten. The snake stalks or pursues the prey and seizes it by the neck, which is crushed in its strong jaws.

FlightC. ornata, like others of its genus, glides or parachutes. This is presumably done to cover distances faster, to escape predators, to catch prey, or to move around in forests. Flying snakes usually parachute from tree to tree, but sometimes launch themselves from trees onto the ground. They have been known to cross as much as 100 m.

It does this by climbing up to a height, which it does easily by virtue of its keeled belly scales, and then launching itself into mid-air. The snake contracts its ventral surface inwards to form a U-shaped concave depression along the entire length of their bodies, holding the outer edges of the ventral scales rigid. This concave surface acts like a parachute, and increases air resistance, allowing the snake to glide forward with the thrust of its launch. The snake undulates through the air, in a swimming-like motion. It holds the tail rigidly upwards, and by twisting the tail from side to side, it attains balance. This motion allows it to propel forward, landing clumsily at the end of its flight.

Human habitatsC. ornata is a common snake and has adapted well to human habitats. In southern parts of Thailand, they are reported to hide in the thatch of the roofing material inside bungalows to prey on geckos and mice during the night. In these areas, one can almost be certain to be relatively close to a C. ornata most anywhere, perhaps hiding in the crown of the nearby coconut palm, under the roots of a tree, or even curled up in a potted plant. When hunting and pursuing fleeing prey, they have been reported to drop down out of the crown of coconut palms. Snakes are often indiscriminately killed, as many locals incorrectly assume all snakes are venomous. C. ornata is sometimes cooked for food.

Reproduction
Breeding habits are little known. The snake is oviparous and six to 12 elongated eggs are laid. Gravid females have been  in May and June and hatchlings in June. In Bangkok, according to Smith, mating takes place in June. Hatchlings measure 114–152 mm (4 to 6 in) long, while the smallest gravid female recorded was 1,093 mm (3 ft 7 in) long.

 In captivity 
In recent years, ornate flying snakes have become increasingly available in the exotic pet trade; many are exported from Vietnam and neighboring countries. Instances of captive breeding are virtually unknown. Due to the species' nervous temperament and difficulty to adjusting to captivity, they tend to make poor captives for all but the most experienced reptile keepers. Many imported specimens have heavy parasite loads, and the stress of captivity all too often leads to a quick death.

References

Further reading

  1890, The Fauna of British India, Including Ceylon and Burma. Reptilia and Batrachia. Taylor & Francis, London, xviii, 541 pp.
  2002 The Book of Indian Reptiles and Amphibians, BNHS & Oxford University Press, Mumbai.
  1943. The Fauna of British India, Ceylon and Burma, Including the Whole of the Indo-Chinese Sub-Region. Reptilia and Amphibia. Vol 3 (Serpentes). Taylor and Francis, London. 583 pp.
  1802. General Zoology, or Systematic Natural History. Vol.3, part 1 + 2''. G. Kearsley, Thomas Davison, London: 313-615

External links

 Flying Snake Home Page.
 C. ornata at Thailand Snakes.

Gliding snakes
Snakes of Asia
Snakes of Southeast Asia
Reptiles of Bangladesh
Snakes of China
Reptiles of Cambodia
Snakes of India
Reptiles of Malaysia
Reptiles of Myanmar
Reptiles of Nepal
Reptiles of the Philippines
Reptiles of Sri Lanka
Reptiles of Thailand
Snakes of Vietnam
Reptiles described in 1802
Taxa named by George Shaw